Wesley ("Wes") T. Barnett (born April 1, 1970, in Saint Joseph, Missouri) was a two-time Olympic weightlifter for the United States.  His coaches were Dennis Snethen, Istvan Javorek at Johnson County Community College and Dragomir Ciroslan.  Barnett earned silver and bronze medal in 1997 at the World Championships in Chang Mai, Thailand.  Barnett currently lives in Monument, Colorado, and is the leading rebounder in the local YMCA league.

Achievements
 1989, 1990 was member of the JCCC Collegiate National Championship team;
 1990 National Collegiate Champion in 90 kg weight class;
 1990 National Junior Champion in 90 kg weight class;
Olympic team member (1992 and 1996)
Bronze medalist In Senior World Championships (1997)
Pan Am Games Champion (1995)
Silver medalist In Pan Am Games (1991)
Bronze medalist in Pan Am Games (1999)
Senior American record holder in clean and jerk and total (1993–1997)

Notes of interest
 Former executive director of USA Weightlifting

External links
Wes Barnett - Hall of Fame at Weightlifting Exchange
 sports-reference

1970 births
Living people
American male weightlifters
Olympic weightlifters of the United States
Weightlifters at the 1991 Pan American Games
Weightlifters at the 1992 Summer Olympics
Weightlifters at the 1996 Summer Olympics
Weightlifters at the 1999 Pan American Games
Sportspeople from St. Joseph, Missouri
Johnson County Community College people
Pan American Games medalists in weightlifting
Pan American Games gold medalists for the United States
Pan American Games silver medalists for the United States
Pan American Games bronze medalists for the United States
Medalists at the 1991 Pan American Games
20th-century American people
21st-century American people